NCAA Cross Country Championship may refer to several annual competitions in cross country running organised by the National Collegiate Athletic Association:

NCAA Men's Division I Cross Country Championship
NCAA Men's Division II Cross Country Championship
NCAA Men's Division III Cross Country Championship
NCAA Women's Division I Cross Country Championship
NCAA Women's Division II Cross Country Championship
NCAA Women's Division III Cross Country Championship